Imen Troudi (born 28 March 1989) is a Tunisian footballer who plays as a midfielder for Emirati side Abu Dhabi Country Club and the Tunisia women's national team.

Club career
Troudi has played for ASF Sahel in Tunisia, for Stjarnan in Iceland and for Abu Dhabi Country in the United Arab Emirates.

International career
Troudi capped for Tunisia at senior level during the 2008 African Women's Championship qualification.

International goals
Scores and results list United Arab Emirates goal tally first

Scores and results list Tunisia goal tally first

See also
List of Tunisia women's international footballers

References

External links

1989 births
Living people
People from Tozeur
Tunisian women's footballers
Women's association football midfielders
Stjarnan women's football players
Úrvalsdeild kvenna (football) players
Tunisia women's international footballers
Tunisian expatriate footballers
Tunisian expatriates in Canada
Expatriate women's soccer players in Canada
Tunisian expatriates in Iceland
Expatriate women's footballers in Iceland
Tunisian emigrants to the United Arab Emirates
Naturalized citizens of the United Arab Emirates
Emirati women's footballers
United Arab Emirates women's international footballers
Dual internationalists (women's football)
Emirati people of Tunisian descent
20th-century Tunisian women
21st-century Tunisian women